Gilliland is a surname. Notable people with the surname include:

Alexis A. Gilliland (born 1931), American science fiction writer and cartoonist
Allan Gilliland (born 1965), Canadian composer
Butch Gilliland (born 1958), American race car driver
Charles L. Gilliland (1933–1951), American soldier and Medal of Honor recipient
David Gilliland (born 1976), American race car driver
Edwin R. Gilliland (1909–1973), American chemical engineer
James Gilliland 
John Gilliland (1935–1998), American radio broadcaster and documentarian
Kaitlyn Gilliland, New York City Ballet dancer
Margaret Sylvia Gilliland (1917–1990), Australian biochemist
Norman Gilliland (born 1949),  producer on Wisconsin Public Radio
Richard Gilliland (1950–2021), American television and movie actor
Thomas Gilliland (fl.1804-1816), English theatre critic

See also